Pristimantis bearsei is a species of frog in the family Strabomantidae. It is endemic to Peru and only known from the region of its type locality northeast of Tarapoto in the San Martín Region. Common name Bearse's robber frog has been coined for this species.

Etymology
The specific name bearsei honours Robert Carleton Bearse, an American physicist. As the Associate Vice Chancellor of the University of Kansas, his administration enhanced the programs of the University of Kansas Natural History Museum.

Description
The dorsum is shagreen and brown with darker brown marks on back and transverse bars on limbs. The venter is brown with cream flecks. The tympanum is prominent. The toes have lateral fringes but no webbing. Males have vocal slits.

Habitat and conservation
Adults have been found on mossy boulders, and some juveniles also on herbaceous vegetation. The species is threatened by habitat loss. Its range overlaps with the Cordillera Azul National Park.

References

bearsei
Amphibians of Peru
Endemic fauna of Peru
Amphibians described in 1992
Taxonomy articles created by Polbot